Lindis Percy (born 1941, Leeds) is a peace activist in the United Kingdom and founding member and joint coordinator of the Campaign for the Accountability of American Bases. Reporting for The Guardian, journalist Rob Evans claimed that "there must surely be few Britons who have been arrested in political protests as many times as [Lindis Percy] has". She is a trained nurse, midwife and health visitor and has worked for the National Health Service her entire working life.

Methods
Percy attended the Department of Peace Studies, University of Bradford in the late 1980s.
As an activist, she uses non-violent direct action and civil disobedience.

Additionally, Ms. Percy also uses legal challenges, often assisted by solicitor Mark Stephens and barrister, Keir Starmer QC and sometimes acts as a litigant in person to make her protests.

Activism
Lindis Percy has been active since 1979, when cruise missiles were to be deployed at Greenham Common.

Legal cases arose from her actions in "uncovering and lawfully exercising ancient rights of way and the right to roam" across United States' NSA intelligence-gathering bases, such as Menwith Hill & Fylingdales located near her Yorkshire home, and further afield at RAF Mildenhall and RAF Lakenheath which, she claims, are actually USAF bases situated in the United Kingdom flagged to the RAF.

In June 1994, the newspapers reported that a series of meetings took place between representatives of the US and British governments "to discuss continuing incursions at US bases and how to deal with on-going US military concerns", as a result of Percy's persistent incursions into American and British bases and her campaigns in general.

The campaign against the Menwith Hill base was documented by Duncan Campbell in the Channel 4 documentary The Hill.

Policy Influence
In 2001, Percy submitted a memorandum to the House of Commons about an expansion of jurisdiction of the Ministry of Defence Police (MDP), which she opposed on several grounds, including what she denoted as an "extension of the jurisdiction of the MDP into areas not naturally within their stated role", thus essentially exposing "the citizen .... to a police force".

In 2002, Percy submitted for information held about her by the government under the Data Protection Act 1998. The MDP admitted that it held a "considerable amount of data" on Percy, but also that it was "so much" and scattered around its filing cabinets, that it would take "too much effort to dig it out". They suggested that she could identify specific incidents to narrow down their search for documents. She did so, but again the MDP refused to retrieve the information, arguing that the documents on her were exempted from release, as they contained "sensitive information" to help in the "prevention and detection of crime".

In 2002, Percy spoke at Levellers Day. She was a speaker at the Global Network 2008 conference, and the European Humanist Conference.

In 2008, Percy gave evidence to a Parliamentary inquiry into police tactics. She subsequently stated "It is becoming increasingly difficult to get satisfaction through the formal processes of our democracy."

She rallied support for the hunger strike of Czech activist Jan Tamas who, along with Jan Bednar, were protesting the Ground-Based Midcourse Defense facility at Brdy.

Percy was a supporter of and participant in the 2009 World March for Peace and Non-Violence.

Personal life
Lindis Percy is married, with three grown children and six grandchildren. She lives with her husband Christopher, a retired chaplain,  in Harrogate, Yorkshire, where her father once worked as a Church of England scout master. She is a Quaker.

Percy was cast in The Mythologist, a film about Habib "Henry" Azadehdel, aka Dr Armen Victorian, a UFO conspiracy theorist.

See also
 Anti-war movement
 Peace movement
 List of peace activists

References

Sources
 "Britain's role in the new cold war", Matthew Holehouse, The New Statesman, 30 August 2007
 "US imposing its values through its global military presence", interview of Lindis Percy to Ramin Etesami, WordPress, 23 July 2008
 "Woman stages palace gates protest", BBC, 18 November 2003

External links
 Campaign for the Accountability of American Bases official website
 Independence From America Day, Menwith Hill, 4 July 2007

British anti–nuclear weapons activists
English Quakers
1941 births
Living people
English Christian pacifists
English midwives